Agrotis malefida, the rascal dart or palesided cutworm, is a moth of the family Noctuidae. It is found from North Carolina and Kentucky south to Florida, west to Arizona, and north to southern Kansas. It is also found in the Neotropics from Mexico to Argentina and Chile.

Adults emerge in late January in the northern part of its range, in the south they fly throughout the year.

The larvae feed on a wide range of broad-leaved herbaceous plants, including Brassica oleracea, Trifolium, Fabaceae, Allium, Pisum sativum, Capsicum, Solanum tuberosum, Nicotiana, Solanum lycopersicum as well as various weeds. It is considered a pest on Zea mays and Gossypium.

External links
species info

Agrotis
Moths of North America
Moths of South America
Moths described in 1852